Lemons is a surname. It may refer to:

 Abe Lemons (1922–2002), American college basketball player and coach
 Amy Lemons, American fashion model and model advocate
 Charlie Lemons (1887–1952), English footballer
 Chris Lemons (born 1979), American soccer player
 Devin Lemons (born 1979), former American football linebacker
 Donald W. Lemons (born 1949), American Chief Justice of the Supreme Court of Virginia
 Quil Lemons (born 1997), American photographer
 Tim Lemons (born 1962), American civil engineer, politician, member of the Arkansas House of Representatives

See also
Lemon (surname)
 Lemon (disambiguation)
 Lemmon (disambiguation)